Samsung Galaxy Trend Lite or Samsung Galaxy Fresh is a low-end Android smartphone released by Samsung Electronics in October 2013.  It has a 4-inch TFT LCD touchscreen and incorporates 3G technology.

References

External links 

 

Samsung smartphones
Galaxy
Galaxy
Mobile phones introduced in 2013